Epicompsa is a genus of moths in the family Geometridae.

Species
 Epicompsa xanthocrossa Guest, 1887

References
 Epicompsa at Markku Savela's Lepidoptera and Some Other Life Forms
 Natural History Museum Lepidoptera genus database

Geometridae